Camp Branch is a stream in Pettis County in the U.S. state of Missouri. It is a tributary of Flat Creek.

Camp Branch was so named for the fact attendees of revivals camped on its banks.

See also
List of rivers of Missouri

References

Rivers of Pettis County, Missouri
Rivers of Missouri